is a Japanese anime television series produced by Studio Pierrot and directed by Kenichiro Watanabe and Takahiro Omori. It is based on the Capcom video game series of the same name. Power Stone aired on TBS in Japan from April 3 to September 25, 1999, for 26 episodes. It was later licensed and dubbed in English by ADV Films in North America and was broadcast on the Canadian YTV channel in 2003.

Plot
The story takes place during the 19th century; Edward Falcon (Édouard Fokker) finds himself on a quest to find the magical power stones and his father, in order to save the world.

Japanese cast
 Masaya Onosaka as Édouard Fokker
 Akio Ohtsuka as Vargas
 Kazuo Oka as Kraken
 Kiyoyuki Yanada as Gunrock
 Masashi Kurada as Garuda
 Megumi Ogata as Wang Tang
 Mitsuo Iwata as Ryoma
 Ryoko Nagata as Rouge
 Tomoko Kawakami as Ayame
 Wataru Takagi as Jack
 Fumihiko Tachiki as Yajirou
 Juurouta Kosugi as Pride
 Kenichi Ogata as Apollis
 Naoki Tatsuta as Wang Tang's Master
 Tomohiro Nishimura as Pasoo
 Toru Ohkawa as Okuto
 Yuji Ueda as Kitarou

English cast
 Robert Tinkler as Edward Falcon
 Edward Glen as Ryoma
 George Buza as Kraken
 Peter Oldring as Wang-Tang
 Stacey Depass as Rouge
 Stephanie Morgenstern as Ayame
 Richard Clarkin as Gunrock
 Dennis Sugiyama as Galuda
 Julie Lemieux as Jack
 Tony Daniels as Valgas
 William Colgate as Apollis
 Damon D'Oliveira as Kikonojo
 Maurice Dean Wint as Pride Falcon

Episode list
Note: English titles come from ADV's volume DVD releases from 2001 to 2002.

References

External links
 
 

1999 anime television series debuts
1999 Japanese television series endings
Action anime and manga
ADV Films
Adventure anime and manga
Anime television series based on video games
Fiction set in the 19th century
 Gemstones in fiction
Mecha anime and manga
Pierrot (company)
TBS Television (Japan) original programming
Television series set in the 19th century
Works based on Capcom video games